The Kuwait International Fair is a large fairground Founded in 1971 and located in Mishrif, Kuwait. The fairgrounds consists of six large air-conditioned exhibition halls, its largest spanning 7,000 square meters.  The fairgrounds is a popular site for several exhibitions that occur in Kuwait, with over 45 occurring annually.

External links
 

Entertainment venues in Kuwait
Fairgrounds
1971 establishments in Kuwait